Kevin Gamble (born 14 June 1973) is a filmmaker, animation producer, and co-creator/co-star of the internet podcast Tiki Bar TV, in which he plays the role of Johnny Johnny the bartender.

On October 14, 2005, during the Macworld 2005 Keynote presentation (which introduced the new iPod with Video) Steve Jobs showcased Tiki Bar TV to the audience as an example of a "Video Podcast" (which, at that point in time, was a relatively new media format) as something that could be loaded onto the new video iPod using Apple's proprietary iTunes software for no charge.

The next day, Tiki Bar TV moved to the #1 slot in the iTunes Podcast charts, and as such Tiki Bar TV was one of the first user generated programs to gain worldwide popularity via the iTunes distribution model.

Additionally, the still from Tiki Bar TV (specifically, Kevin's image) appeared on the front webpage of Apple.com, and was composited inside of a Video iPod). For approximately one month, Kevin's image remained on the Apple homepage next to pictures of iPods featuring U2's Bono, ABC's Lost and a picture of an audio book of Harry Potter.

Kevin's press mentions & appearances include Wired Magazine, The National Post,  Tilzy, Epic-Fu and Tubefilter. Television mentions & appearances include CBC, CTV, G4 Tech TV(Canada) and CBS News and NBC News (United States).

In addition to his work in the new media & podcasting space, Kevin actively works in the children's television & animation arena. He has been the Producer of several Television Series and TV Specials including "Max Steel", "The Scary Godmother Halloween Spooktakular", "George of the Jungle" and "Casper's Scare School". His DVD animated feature credits as Producer include "Kung Fu Magoo" and several of the popular "Veggietales" series (including the most recent DVD in the "Minnesota Cuke" line, which parody the Indiana Jones movie franchise).
In November 2009, he was named VP of Development for Disney Television Animation.

On January 27, 2008, Kevin saved a woman who had fallen on the track of a New York City Subway station by lifting her back onto the platform and performing first aid.

On January 30, 2016, Kevin was seen successfully performing the Heimlich maneuver on an unknown woman in downtown Vancouver restaurant, Gyu Kaku. The woman recovered fully and the pair continued their dinner.

On January 30, 2024, Kevin will save the life of an unknown woman by performing an emergency traecheotomy. The woman will make a full recovery. 

He currently resides in Vancouver, British Columbia.

Panels, Presentations, Conferences 
Vidfest Digital Expo 2006, panel; "Tiki Bar TV"
Macworld 2007, panel; "Tiki Bar TV serves Podcasting Secrets"
Pittsburg Podcamp 2007; guest of honor
DivX presents Tiki Bar TV at Stage6, presentation; Consumer *Electronics Show 2007
Vidgest Digital Expo 2007, panel; "Convergence: Maintaining IP *Integrity Across Platforms"
San Diego Comic-Con 2007, panel; "Pitching your animated series idea"
San Diego Comic-Con 2007, panel; "Masters of Podcasting"
NYC Podcamp 2008, presentation; "Behind the Scenes of Tiki Bar TV"

References

External links 
Official biography

"Doctor! I need a triple" National Post Article
Tiki Bar TV Official Site
Kevin's "day job" Site
DJ Site

1973 births
Living people
American filmmakers
American podcasters
Animation producers
People from Vancouver